A private railway is a railroad run by a private business entity (usually a corporation but not need be), as opposed to a railroad run by a public sector.

Japan
In Japan, commonly simply private railway, refers to a public transit railway owned and operated by private sector, almost always organized as a joint-stock company, or in Japanese: kabushiki gaisha (lit. stock company), but may be any type of private business entity. Although the Japan Railways Group (JR Group) companies are also kabushiki gaishas, they are not classified as private railways because of their unique status as the primary successors of the Japanese National Railways (JNR).  Voluntary sector railways (semi-public) are additionally not classified as shitetsu due to their origins as rural, money-losing JNR lines that have since been transferred to local possession, in spite of their organizational structures being corporatized.

Among private railways in Japan, the  categorizes 16 companies as "major" operators. These same companies also utilize quadruple track and skip-stop services like varying hierarchies of express trains.  They are often profitable and tend to be less expensive per passenger-kilometer than JR trains that also run less dense regional routes, and assumed a heavy burden of the former JNR debt.  Private railways corporations in Japan also run and generate profits from a variety of other businesses that depend on the traffic generated through their transit systems: hotels, department stores, supermarkets, resorts, and real estate development and leasing.

Japan railways whether government run, semi-public, or private business, are regulated by the Ministry of Land, Infrastructure, Transport and Tourism.  They may join unions such as National Railway Workers' Union and General Federation of Private Railway and Bus Workers' Unions of Japan, but their abilities to call a strike is severely limited by government legislation; there is very little tolerance for railway work stoppage.  Employees of private railways may legally strike but its unheard of in Japan.  There have only been two notable railroad strikes in Japanese history, both by employees of government run entities (government employees are legally barred from striking): One in 1973, and a major strike protesting the breakup (and layoffs of tens of thousands of employees) of JNR in 1985.

Though private railways such as industrial railways have existed in Japan they are not deemed shitetsu nor mintetsu in Japanese, as their purpose is not public transit.

Tokyo Metro is a member of Japan Private Railway Association but is under special laws and its stock is owned by the Japanese Government and Tokyo Metropolis (pending privatization). Whether Tokyo Metro counts as Shitetsu depends on the speaker.

United States

In the United States, a private railroad is a railroad owned by a company and serves only that company, and does not hold itself out as a "common carrier" (i.e., it does not provide rail transport services for the general public).

See also
Industrial railway
Railway nationalization
National Rail (UK)

References

Railways by type